Moretta is a comune (municipality) in the Province of Cuneo in the Italian region Piedmont, located about  southwest of Turin and about  north of Cuneo.

The municipality of Moretta contains the frazioni (subdivisions, mainly villages and hamlets) Boglio, Bogliotto, Brasse, Brasse Piccolo, Pasco, Piattera, Prese, Roncaglia, and Tetti Varaita.

Moretta borders the following municipalities: Cardè, Faule, Murello, Polonghera, Saluzzo, Torre San Giorgio, Villafranca Piemonte, and Villanova Solaro.

Demographic evolution

References

External links 
 www.comune.moretta.cn.it/

Cities and towns in Piedmont